The Nicaragua national under-17 basketball team is a national basketball team of Nicaragua, managed by the Federación Nicaraguense de Baloncesto.

It represents the country in international under-16 and under-17 (under age 16 and under age 17) basketball competitions.

It appeared at the COCABA U16 Championship for Men.

References

External links
Archived records of Nicaragua team participations

Basketball teams in Nicaragua
Men's national under-17 basketball teams
Basketball